Khud, also rendered as Khod, may refer to:
 Khud-e Bala
 Khud-e Pain

Other uses 
KHUD, a radio station in Tucson, Arizona, United States

Broadcast call sign disambiguation pages